These are the international rankings of Angola.

International rankings

References

Angola